Bizwell Phiri (died 1994) was a Zambian football player and manager.

Career
Phiri played as a defender for Zambia in the 1978 African Cup of Nations, where he scored a goal against Upper Volta. He joined South African side Jomo Cosmos F.C. in 1988.

After he retired from playing, Phiri became a football coach. In 1992, he was appointed manager of Bush Bucks F.C., and led the club to the 1993 Coca-Cola Challenge Cup title.

Personal
In 1994, Phiri was killed in an automobile accident in South Africa.

References

External links

1994 deaths
Zambian footballers
Zambia international footballers
1978 African Cup of Nations players
Jomo Cosmos F.C. players
Zambian football managers
Year of birth missing
Road incident deaths in South Africa
Association football defenders